Axinidris okekai is a species of ant in the genus Axinidris. Described by Snelling in 2007, the species is endemic to Kenya, where specimens have been collected from vines.

References

Axinidris
Hymenoptera of Africa
Insects described in 2007